Emmalocera is a genus of snout moths. It was described by Émile Louis Ragonot in 1888.

Species
 Emmalocera actinoleuca Hampson, 1918
 Emmalocera anerastica (Snellen, 1880)
 Emmalocera apotomella (Meyrick, 1879)
 Emmalocera approximella (Hampson, 1918)
 Emmalocera aurifusellus (Walker, 1866)
 Emmalocera biseriella (Hampson, 1901)
 Emmalocera callirrhoda (Turner, 1904)
 Emmalocera castanealis Hampson, 1912
 Emmalocera celsella (Walker, 1863)
 Emmalocera crenatella Ragonot, 1888
 Emmalocera ctenucha (Turner, 1913)
 Emmalocera dimochla (Turner, 1947)
 Emmalocera distictella (Hampson, 1918)
 Emmalocera endopyrella Hampson, 1918
 Emmalocera eremochroa Hampson, 1918
 Emmalocera eurysticha (Turner, 1904)
 Emmalocera euryzona (Meyrick, 1883)
 Emmalocera flavodorsalis Janse, 1922
 Emmalocera furvimacula (Hampson, 1918)
 Emmalocera fuscostrigella Ragonot, 1888
 Emmalocera haploschema (Turner, 1904)
 Emmalocera holochra (Turner, 1904)
 Emmalocera icasmopis (Turner, 1904)
 Emmalocera laminella Hampson, 1901
 Emmalocera laropis (Turner, 1913)
 Emmalocera lateritiella (Hampson, 1918)
 Emmalocera latilimbella (Ragonot, 1890)
 Emmalocera leucocinctus (Walker, 1863)
 Emmalocera leucopleura (Hampson, 1918)
 Emmalocera longiramella Hampson, 1901
 Emmalocera lutosa Janse, 1922
 Emmalocera macrella Ragonot, 1888
 Emmalocera macrorrhynca (Turner, 1923)
 Emmalocera marcida (Turner, 1923)
 Emmalocera minoralis (Lower, 1903)
 Emmalocera miserabilis (Strand, 1919)
 Emmalocera neesimella Ragonot, 1901
 Emmalocera neotomella (Meyrick, 1879)
 Emmalocera nigricostalis Walker, 1863
 Emmalocera niphopleura (Turner, 1913)
 Emmalocera niphosema (Turner, 1913)
 Emmalocera ochracealis Hampson, 1912
 Emmalocera paucigraphella Ragonot, 1888
 Emmalocera pelochroa (Turner, 1947)
 Emmalocera phaeostrotella (Hampson, 1918)
 Emmalocera phaeoneura (Hampson, 1918)
 Emmalocera platymochla (Turner, 1947)
 Emmalocera pleurochorda (Turner, 1913)
 Emmalocera polychroella Hampson, 1918
 Emmalocera radiatella Hampson, 1901
 Emmalocera rhabdota (Turner, 1904)
 Emmalocera rhodoessa (Turner, 1904)
 Emmalocera rotundipennis de Joannis, 1930
 Emmalocera sangirensis (Hampson, 1918)
 Emmalocera scripta (de Joannis, 1927)
 Emmalocera sepicostella Ragonot, 1888
 Emmalocera signicollis Berg, 1875
 Emmalocera simplicipalpis Strand, 1920
 Emmalocera stereosticha (Turner, 1905)
 Emmalocera stictella (Hampson, 1908)
 Emmalocera strigicostella (Hampson, 1896)
 Emmalocera subconcinnella Ragonot, (1890) 1891
 Emmalocera syssema (Turner, 1913)
 Emmalocera tenuicostella Ragonot, 1888
 Emmalocera thiomochla (Turner, 1947)
 Emmalocera transecta (Turner, 1947)
 Emmalocera tricoloralis Hampson, 1903
 Emmalocera umbricostella Ragonot, 1888
 Emmalocera umbrivittella Ragonot, 1888
 Emmalocera unitella de Joannis, 1927

References

 
Anerastiini
Pyralidae genera
Taxa named by Émile Louis Ragonot